Montanelli may refer to:

People 
Giuseppe Montanelli (1813–1862), Italian statesman and author
Indro Montanelli (1909–2001), Italian journalist and author

Places 
Montanelli, Palaia, a village in Tuscany